Rio Grande Blood is the tenth studio album by American industrial metal band Ministry, released in 2006. It is their first release through 13th Planet and Megaforce Records.

Overview 
The album is the second installment in the band's anti-George W. Bush trilogy, preceded by 2004's Houses of the Molé and followed by 2007's The Last Sucker.

The title of the album is a parody of the 1972 ZZ Top album Rio Grande Mud.

Just like Houses of the Molé, Rio Grande Blood contains very political lyrics, making frequent allusions to the George W. Bush administration. The second track makes an explicit reference to Bush as Señor Peligro, which translates to "Mr. Danger" in Spanish. Some of the issues raised include the then-current Iraq War, U.S. immigration policy and U.S. military policy (particularly the United States Marine Corps in the song "Gangreen"). The Halliburton corporation is also quoted and linked to the Bush administration.

The album also contains allegations of the Bush administration complicity in the September 11 attacks in the track "Lieslieslies," which contains audio samples from the conspiracy documentary series Loose Change. The song received a nomination for Best Metal Performance at the 49th Grammy Awards.

A remix of the song "The Great Satan" from Rantology appears on this album. Along with "LiesLiesLies", "The Great Satan" was also nominated for a Grammy.

Samples of genuine Bush soundbites are cut-and-pasted together at various points to satirical effect: for example, the title track begins with Bush stating "I have adopted sophisticated terrorist tactics and I'm a dangerous, dangerous man with dangerous, dangerous weapons."

The album was re-released in remixed form as Rio Grande Dub on July 10, 2007.

Jourgensen ranks Rio Grande Blood as his second favorite Ministry album saying that not only he liked the songs but he had a good time working with Paul Raven and Tommy Victor. He was also proud that some of the songs were used in the 2008 Academy Award winning film The Hurt Locker.

Track listing

Personnel

Ministry
 Al Jourgensen - lead vocals, lead guitar (1), guitars (1-3, 5-10), bass (1, 6), keyboards (1-10), drum programming (1, 6), production
 Tommy Victor - guitars (2-5, 7-10), bass (2-4)
 Paul Raven - keyboards (2, 3, 10), backing vocals (2, 3), bass (5, 7-10), guitars (7, 9, 10) drum programming (7, 9), drums (10)
 Mark Baker - drums (2, 3, 5, 8, 10)

Additional personnel
 Isaias Martinez - Latin vocals (2)
 Freddie Macias - background vocals (2, 3)
 Sgt. Major - drill instructor vocals (3, 13)
 Bobby Torres - background vocals (3)
 Jim Ward - background vocals (3)
 Justin Leeah - drum programming (4), engineering
 Mike Scaccia - lead guitar (6)
 Jello Biafra - intro vocals (9)
 Liz Constantine - additional vocals (10)
 John Gray - engineering
 John Bilberry - assistant engineering
 Dave Donnelly - mastering
 Lawton Outlaw - art direction, design, layout

In popular culture
The song "Palestina" is used in the skateboarding game Tony Hawk's Downhill Jam.
The sound after the opening speech at the album's beginning is sampled from the track "Snagglepuss" by John Zorn.
The song "Señor Peligro" is used in the video game Scarface: The World Is Yours.
The song "Lieslieslies" is featured in the 2007 film Battle for Haditha.
The songs "Lieslieslies" and "The Great Satan" are available as downloadable content for the video game Rock Band 2.
The songs "Fear (Is Big Business)", "Palestina", and "Khyber Pass" were used in the Academy Award-winning 2009 film The Hurt Locker.

Chart positions

References

Bibliography 
 

2006 albums
Albums produced by Al Jourgensen
Megaforce Records albums
Ministry (band) albums
Cultural depictions of George W. Bush
Obscenity controversies in music